The Molson Cash Spiel was an annual bonspiel, or curling tournament, held as part of the women's World Curling Tour. The event was held in November and took place at the Duluth Curling Club in Duluth, Minnesota. It was held in conjunction with the Coors Light Cash Spiel on the men's World Curling Tour. It last ran in 2006.

Past champions

External links
Duluth Curling Club website

Former World Curling Tour events
Sports in Duluth, Minnesota
Curling in Minnesota
Ontario Curling Tour events
Recurring sporting events established in 2004